JWB may refer to:
National Jewish Welfare Board, Jewish organization in the United States
John Wayne Bobbitt (born 1967), victim of a crime
John Wilkes Booth (1838–1865), American actor and assassin who murdered Abraham Lincoln
Jinwanbao, Chinese newspaper